Yuriy Rudynskyi (born 14 January 1962) is a former football player and current manager.

He played for FC Mayak Kharkiv, FC Kryvbas Kryvyi Rih, FC Energomash Belgorod and FC Atlantyka Sevastopol, and he coached several junior teams of FC Metalist Kharkiv.

External links 
 
 Kutepov: Head coach of SC Mtalist will be Yuriy Rudynskyi (Кутєпов: Головним тренером СК Металіст буде Юрій Рудинський). UA-Football. 15 July 2016.

1962 births
Living people
Soviet footballers
Ukrainian footballers
Ukrainian expatriate footballers
Expatriate footballers in Russia
FC Metalist Kharkiv players
FC Olympik Kharkiv players
FC Chayka Sevastopol players
FC Kryvbas Kryvyi Rih players
FC Kremin Kremenchuk players
FC Metalurh Kupyansk players
FC Torpedo Zaporizhzhia players
FC Avanhard Merefa players
Ukrainian football managers
Association football forwards
Association football midfielders
FC Salyut Belgorod players